The Nationalist Republican Party (PNR) was a political party in Suriname, existing from 1959 to 1980.

History 
In 1951, Surinamese students in the Netherlands founded the cultural association Wi Eigi Sani ("our own things"). In 1959, the association became a political party under the name "Nationalist Republican Party" (PNR), and began its activities in Suriname. In the 1969 parliamentary election, the party secured one seat, by Eddy Bruma. In 1973, in a coalition with the National Party of Suriname, the party won 4 seats in the parliament. In the cabinet of Henck Arron from December 24, 1973 to 1977, the cabinet consisted of 3 representatives of the party.

In 1977, the coalition broke up and the Nationalist Republican Party went to the elections independently, without receiving seats in the parliament. On 25 February 1980, a military coup led by sergeant Dési Bouterse overthrew Arron's government. Bouterse began to rule Suriname as the head of the National Military Council, created by him. He dissolved the parliament, abolished the constitution, introduced a state of emergency in the country and created a special tribunal that examined the affairs of members of the former government and large businessmen. Members of the Nationalist Republican Party were members of the National Military Council. Party member Henk Chin A Sen was president from August 15, 1980 to February 4, 1982. After the restoration of democracy in 1987, the party was not restored. The Surinamese Labour Party is considered to be the successor of the Nationalist Republican Party of Suriname.

Electoral results

See also
:Category:Nationalist Republican Party (Suriname) politicians

References  

Defunct political parties in Suriname
Social democratic parties in South America